The 2017 Rock Cup was a single-leg knockout tournament played by clubs from Gibraltar. This year's version of the Rock Cup was sponsored by Gibtelecom, and was known as the Gibtelecom Rock Cup for sponsorship purposes.

The winner of this competition (Europa) qualified for the 2017–18 Europa League. Since they won the 2016–17 Gibraltar Premier Division, the spot reserved for the cup winner went to the third place team from the league instead.

First round
The First Round draw was held 14 December 2016 and the matches were played 17–18 January 2017. All teams participating in the first round are from the Gibraltar Second Division.

Second round
The Second Round draw took place on 20 January 2017, and the matches were played from 10–15 February. Teams from the Premier Division, the three winners from the first round, as well as the three sides who received byes in the first round, entered here.

Quarter–finals
The quarter-final matches were played 10–12 March 2017.

Semi–finals
The semi-final matches were played 25–26 April 2017.

Final

See also
2016–17 Gibraltar Premier Division
2016–17 Gibraltar Second Division

References

External links
Gibraltar Football Association

Rock Cup
Rock Cup
Rock Cup